Salt Water Moose is a 1996 Canadian family film directed by Stuart Margolin. Filmed in Toronto and in Nova Scotia, it stars Timothy Dalton, Lolita Davidovich, Johnny Morina, and Katharine Isabelle.

Plot
The plot revolves around two kids who decide to help a bull moose stranded on an island by floating a female moose to the island.

Cast
 Johnny Morina as Bobby Scofield
Katharine Isabelle as Josephine 'Jo' Parnell 
Timothy Dalton as Lester Parnell
Lolita Davidovich as Eva Scofield
 Corinne Conley as Grandma

Reception
In 1997 Margolin won a Directors Guild of America Award for Outstanding Directing – Children's Programs for his direction of this film.

References

External links
 
 Salt Water Moose at TCM
 Salt Water Moose at British Film Institute

1996 films
1990s English-language films
Films directed by Stuart Margolin